Halicampus marquesensis is a species of fish of the family Syngnathidae. It is found primarily off of the coast of the Marquesas Islands, in French Polynesia, although other unconfirmed specimens have been reported in Fiji and Papua New Guinea. It likely feeds on small crustaceans, similar to other pipefish. This species is ovoviviparous, with males carrying eggs in a brood pouch before giving birth to live young.

References

Further reading
WoRMS

Taxa named by Charles Eric Dawson
Fish described in 1984
marquesensis
Marine fish